Red Pottage may refer to:

 Red Pottage (novel), an 1899 British novel by Mary Cholmondeley
 Red Pottage (film), a 1918 British film adaptation directed by Meyrick Milton